Heleen Hage (born 13 October 1958) is a Dutch former road racing cyclist who was active from 1983 to 1989. In her career, she achieved second place overall 1984 Grande Boucle (women's Tour de France), winning stages 4, 13 and 15. In 1986 she became the Dutch national road cycling champion and in 1987 secured the silver medal in the road race at the World Championships. She also competed in the women's individual road race at the 1988 Summer Olympics.

She comes from a family of cyclists and is the sister of Keetie Hage, Bella Hage and Ciska Hage, and is an aunt to Jan van Velzen.

See also
 List of Dutch Olympic cyclists

References

External links

1958 births
Living people
Dutch female cyclists
People from Tholen
UCI Road World Championships cyclists for the Netherlands
Cyclists from Zeeland
Olympic cyclists of the Netherlands
Cyclists at the 1988 Summer Olympics
20th-century Dutch women